"Hey, Mamma!" (also "Hey Mamma") is a song written and performed by the Moldovan group SunStroke Project. It was released as a digital download on 6 February 2017 by Ragoza Music. It represented Moldova in the Eurovision Song Contest 2017.

Eurovision Song Contest

SunStroke Project was confirmed to be taking part in O melodie pentru Europa 2017, Moldova's national selection for the Eurovision Song Contest 2017 on 18 January 2017 and later confirmed to have qualified to the semi-finals after a live audition on 20 January. The group won the jury vote in the semi-final, held on 24 February, and qualified directly for the final. During the final, held on 25 February, the group was second with the juries and first with the televoters, effectively winning the tiebreak and being declared the winner. Moldova competed in the second half of the first semi-final for the Eurovision Song Contest and went through to the Grand Final.

In the Grand Final, it finished third overall with 374 points, which is Moldova's best result in the contest to date.

Track listing

Charts

Release history

References

Eurovision songs of Moldova
Eurovision songs of 2017
2016 songs
2017 singles
SunStroke Project songs